The Judgment is a 2018 Thai-language television series starring Lapassalan Jiravechsoontornkul, Kacha Nontanan Anchuleepradit and Thanabordee Jaiyen. The plot revolves around a 20 year old college student Lookkaew (Lapassalan Jiravechsoontornkul) who is dating Aud (Thanabordee Jaiyen). At a party, someone rapes Lookkaew while she's drunk and photos and videos surface online.

Cast

Main Character
 Lapassalan Jiravechsoontornkul as Lookkaew Nareerat Satthakul
 Kacha Nontanun Anchuleepradit as Archawin (Archa)
 Thanabordee Jaiyen as Audtachai Laowisedsakul (Aud)

Supporting Character
 Nara Thepnupa as Somrudee (Som)
 Liewrakolan Pongsatorn as Potae
 Pam Pamiga Sooksawee as Petchpraew
 Mond Tanutchai Vijitvongthong as Namnhao/Namnuea
 Fifa Premanan Sripanich as Jamie
 Apasiri Nitibhon as Buppha (Lookkaew's Stepmother)
 Wasu Sansingkaew as Winai
 Arshiraya Perapatkunchaya as Professor Manita
 Gulasatree Michalsky as Namtarn

Cameo
 M Phurin Ruangvivatjarus as Aud's friend

Release
The Judgment was released on November 1, 2018 on Netflix streaming but departed in November 2022.

References

External links
 
 

2010s Thai television series
2018 Thai television series debuts
Thai-language television shows
GMM 25 original programming